"When The Fiendish Ghouls Night" is the fourth single by the Japanese horror punk band Balzac. Released through their own label, Evilegend13 Records, it was sold in four different colors for the vinyl and sticker. In 2007, Balzac re-launched the single in CD format, with two bonus tracks.

Track listing: LP version
"When The Fiendish Ghouls Night"

Track listing: CD version
"When The Fiendish Ghouls Night"
"Horrorwood"
"When The Fiendish Ghouls Night (Live)"

Credits
 Hirosuke - vocals
 Atsushi - guitar, vocals, chorus
 Akio - bass guitar, chorus
 Masami - drums, chorus
 Takayuki - drums (for CD version)

External links
Official Balzac Japan site
Official Balzac USA site
Official Balzac Europe site

1996 singles
Balzac (band) songs
1996 songs